Elaine Scarry (born June 30, 1946) is an American essayist and professor of English and American Literature and Language. She is the Walter M. Cabot Professor of Aesthetics and the General Theory of Value at Harvard University. Her interests include Theory of Representation, the Language of Physical Pain, and Structure of Verbal and Material Making in Art, Science and the Law. She was formerly Professor of English at the University of Pennsylvania. She is a recipient of the Truman Capote Award for Literary Criticism.

Life
She is the author of The Body in Pain which is known as a definitive study of pain and inflicting pain.
She argues that physical pain leads to destruction and the unmaking of the human world, whereas human creation at the opposite end of the spectrum leads to the making of the world.

In 1998, she delivered the essay 'On Beauty and Being Just', for the Tanner Lectures on Human Values, an inquiry into the disparagement of beauty in western civilization in the twentieth century.

Her 1999 study, Dreaming by the Book won the Truman Capote Award for Literary Criticism.

In 2014, she published a book about nuclear weapons, Thermonuclear Monarchy, in which she 'explores the baleful political consequences of limiting the control of nuclear weapons to a select few, and the authority to launch them to even fewer – in the case of the United States, to the president alone in what amounts to his monarchical power.'

Hypotheses on plane crashes 

In 1998, Elaine Scarry authored an article The Fall of TWA 800: The Possibility of Electromagnetic Interference which appeared in The New York Review of Books. The article's basic hypothesis – which does not enjoy support from most scientists or engineers – is that electromagnetic interference from a P-3 Orion aircraft may have been responsible for the center fuel tank explosion during that flight in 1996. Scarry subsequently published another article hypothesizing that another plane crash, that of EgyptAir 990, was caused by  electromagnetic interference of the type that could result from transmission from a military source in the vicinity of the crash. This article, entitled "The Fall of EgyptAir 990", was also published in The New York Review of Books on October 5, 2000. In a critique of Professor Scarry's hypothesis, Professor Didier de Fontaine, Professor Emeritus at UC Berkeley, discusses what he views as the less than scientific basis of Scarry's "unfriendly skies" scenarios, and concludes that she has engaged in "voodoo science".

Education
 A.B., 1968, Chatham College
 A.M., Ph.D., 1974, University of Connecticut

Honors
 Guggenheim Fellowship (1987), Philosophy
 Truman Capote Award for Literary Criticism (2000) for Dreaming by the Book
 Elected Member, American Philosophical Society (2013)
 Honorary doctorate from Uppsala University, Sweden (2018)

Works

Books
  
 
 
 
 
 On Beauty and Being Just, Princeton University Press, 1999, 
 
 
 Literature and the Body: Essays on Populations and Persons, Johns Hopkins University Press, 1990,

Essays
 The Fall of EgyptAir 990 (The New York Review of Books, 2000)
 The Fall of TWA 800: The Possibility of Electromagnetic Interference (The New York Review of Books, 1998)
 On Beauty and Being Just

Editor
 
 Fins de Siècle: English Poetry in 1590, 1690, 1790, 1890, 1990, Johns Hopkins University Press, 1995,

References

External links
 New York Review of Books: Elaine Scarry
 Profile in The Chronicle of Higher Education by Nathan Schneider

1946 births
Harvard University faculty
University of Connecticut alumni
Chatham University alumni
Living people
American academics of English literature
American literary theorists
Carnegie Council for Ethics in International Affairs
American women essayists
20th-century American essayists
20th-century American women writers
21st-century American essayists
21st-century American women writers
Members of the American Philosophical Society
American women academics